Hydropunctaria oceanica is a species of crustose lichen in the family Verrucariaceae. It is a marine lichen. Found in Great Britain, it was formally described as a new species in 2012 by lichenologist Alan Orange. The type specimen was collected near Haverfordwest (Pembrokeshire, Wales), where it was found growing on siliceous rocks on the seashore. It has also been recorded in Ireland. The species epithet oceanica refers to its growth near the ocean. The lichen is similar in appearance, and often grows contiguously with the common and widespread littoral zone lichen Hydropunctaria maura, but is genetically distinct from that species.

References

Verrucariales
Lichen species
Lichens described in 2012
Lichens of Northern Europe
Taxa named by Alan Orange